Megaton may refer to:

 A million tons 
 Megaton TNT equivalent, explosive energy equal to 4.184 petajoules
 megatonne, a million tonnes, SI unit of mass

Other uses
 Olivier Megaton (born 1965), French film director, writer and editor
 Megaton (magazine), a gaming comic
 Wellington "Megaton" Dias (born 1967), a Brazilian jiu-jitsu practitioner and instructor
 Megaton (Fallout 3), a fictional town built around a nuclear bomb in the video game Fallout 3
 "Megaton Punch", a mini-game in the games Kirby Super Star and Kirby Super Star Ultra
 Megaton, a superhero anthology self-published by Gary Carlson from 1981 to 1987

See also
 Kiloton
 Gigaton
 Teraton
 Petaton
 Exaton